İshak Çakmak (born 20 November 1992) is a Turkish footballer who plays as a midfielder for Iğdır.

External links
 
 
 

1992 births
People from Bulanık
Living people
Turkish footballers
Association football midfielders
Konyaspor footballers
Boluspor footballers
Gaziantep F.K. footballers
Balıkesirspor footballers
Ankara Keçiörengücü S.K. footballers
Bandırmaspor footballers
MKE Ankaragücü footballers
Süper Lig players
TFF First League players
TFF Second League players
TFF Third League players